The Social Liberal Party of Sandžak (Socijalno-liberalna partija Sandžaka) was a centre-left Bosniak minority political party in Serbia. Its only leader was Bajram Omeragić.

History
During the renewed registration in April 2010, the party did not register and merged into the Party of Democratic Action of Sandžak, to which it transferred its only seat.

Electoral results

Parliamentary elections

See also
Liberalism in Serbia

References

2010 disestablishments in Serbia
Bosniak political parties in Serbia
Defunct liberal political parties
Defunct political parties in Serbia
Liberal parties in Serbia
Political parties disestablished in 2010
Political parties with year of establishment missing